= Rachael Martin =

American politician

Mayor of Maryville, Missouri
- In office April 10, 2018 – June 8, 2020
- Preceded by: Jason McDowell
- Succeeded by: Benjamin Lipiec

Mayor pro tem of Maryville, Missouri
- In office April 2016 – April 9, 2018

City Council of Maryville, Missouri
- In office April 14, 2014 – April 10, 2023

Rachael Martin is the former mayor of Maryville, Missouri." She was appointed April 10, 2018 after serving two years as mayor pro tem.

Martin was first elected to the City Council in April 2014 at the age of 27 and is the youngest person to serve as mayor of Maryville.

Martin is on the Board of Directors for the Maryville Chamber of Commerce and the Board of Directors for the Maryville Downtown Improvement Organization. She holds a Bachelor of Science in Marketing from Northwest Missouri State University.
